Marco Fedele Gonzaga (died 8 September 1583) was a Roman Catholic prelate who served as Bishop of Mantua (1574–1583), and Bishop of Ossero (1550–1574).

Biography
On 2 June 1550, Marco Fedele Gonzaga was appointed during the papacy of Pope Julius III as Bishop of Ossero. On 28 November 1574, he was appointed during the papacy of Pope Gregory XIII as Bishop of Mantova. He served as Bishop of Mantova until his death on 8 September 1583.

References

External links and additional sources
 (for Chronology of Bishops) 
 (for Chronology of Bishops) 

16th-century Italian Roman Catholic bishops
Bishops appointed by Pope Julius III
Bishops of Mantua
1583 deaths